Goalpariya may refer to:

 anything associated with the Goalpara region of northeastern India
 Goalpariya dialect, the dialects spoken in the undivided Goalpara 
 Goalpariya people, the native speakers of Goalpariya
 Goalpariya Lokgeet, the folk songs in Goalpariya